Cabrillanes (Astur-Leonese: Vabia d'Arriba) is a municipality located in the province of León, Castile and León, Spain.

Population 
According to the 2010 census (INE), Cabrillanes' municipality has a population of 964 inhabitants.

Villages 
Cabrillanes' municipality has fourteen villages (Astur-Leonese / Spanish):
 Cabrichanes / Cabrillanes ( / )
 La Cueta
 Güergas / Huergas de Babia
 Ḷḷau / Lago de Babia
 Meirói / Meroy
 Mena / Mena de Babia
 Las Murias / Las Murias de Babia
 Penalba / Peñalba de Cilleros
 Piedrafita / Piedrafita de Babia
 Quintanieḷḷa / Quintanilla de Babia
 La Riera / Riera de Babia
 San Feles / San Félix de Arce
 Torre / Torre de Babia
 Veiga Viechos / Vega de Viejos

References

Municipalities in the Province of León